Va' har du under blusen, Rut? is a song written by Lennart Witoslaw (born 1950), and originally recorded by him releasing it as 1973 single with Porriga Billy acting as B-side. The song was also recorded by Schytts, releasing it as a 1974 single with En annan stad, en annan vän ("Another Town, Another Train") acting as B-side. and in 1974 it was also recorded by Stefan Rüdén, Tre blå, Winners and Zenits.

In 1974, the song was also recorded by the Streaplers, releasing it as a single and their version also charted at Svensktoppen for six weeks between 17 March-21 April 1974, peaking at fifth position.

In 1975, the song was recorded by the musician Nils Dacke on the album Nils Dacke spelar partyorgel. It was also recorded in 1975 by Lasse Green.

In 1995, the song was recorded by Flintstens med Stanley on the album Stenhårda låtar 1.

At Dansbandskampen 2008, the song was performed by Zlips.

References 

1973 singles
1974 singles
Schytts songs
Streaplers songs
Swedish-language songs
1973 songs